The Cathedral of Our Lady of Miracles, Indo-Portuguese; Catedral de Nossa Senhora dos Milagres (formerly a parish church as the Church of Our Lady of Miracles), is a Roman Catholic Cathedral situated at Kallianpur in the Udipi district of Carnataca, India.

The Milagres Church was established in 1680 as a result of a treaty between Raja Shivappa Nayaka (the Ikkeris) of Bednore and the Portuguese in Goa and Bombay-Bassein. The structure was rebuilt in its present form in 1881 AD, after the persecution of Mangalorean Christians at Seringapatam ended. The Milagres parish was elevated to the status of a cathedral church in 2012, giving a desirable fillip to the Konkani and South Canarese Christian people of the locality.

History

During the period of the Keladi Nayakas, Kallianpur emerged as an important Christian settlement in South Canara. In 1678, the church was constructed by the Portuguese in Goa and Bombay, and dedicated to Our Lady of Miracles. The land on which the church was built was gifted to the local Christians by Somashekara Nayaka I of the Ikkeris.

The miraculous statue of Milagres Kallianpur was extracted from writings of Charles E G Lewis Kallianpur dated 1982. The statue of Our Lady of Milagres, Kallianpur is popularly acclaimed to be miraculous in and around the surrounding area. When the East India company lost the Anglo-Mysore war in 1784, Tipu Sultan gave secret orders to his commanders to seize all Christians in Canara and take them captive to Seringapatam. They carried out the secret orders and entered every church simultaneously, where Christians were expected to gather on the occasion of Good Friday. Entire families with children in arms were cruelly hounded and herded into a forced march across the Western Ghats. Only a few people managed to stay in hiding or escape into the forests. Nearly all the churches in Canara were destroyed as were the churches at Barkur and Patre. The priests had either gone into hiding or had been captured and deported to Goa and Damaon. It was at this time that the enemy soldiers wreaked havoc, destroying everything as they attempted to remove the Statue of our Lady on the High Altar for desecration. However, they found that it was not possible to remove it or lift it with their hands. They used force and tools but without any success. But then, at that very moment, a large swarm of bees suddenly came upon them from an unknown place and attacked them. They ran for shelter, and the bees followed them. They rode down as far as the Severna river; the bees still pursued them until the soldiers dived and tried to hide in the water. This occurrence was known far and wide in the area and produced awe and reverence among the people including non-Christians, who are to Our Lady of Miracles as their Milagri Amma, Kanarese for "mother of miracles".

At that time one of the parishioners who were in hiding Menino Francies Luis of Nadu Kudru, Tonse, secretly carried away the Miraculous Statue from the devastated church after praying and promising that he would place her with due honor when the ordeal was be over. He carried her to his home in Tons and venerated her secretly with his family and other Christians in night vigils with rosaries and reading of the Christian Purana (Kristapurana) of Fr Thomas Stevens SJ. The statue had sometimes to be hidden in other houses and especially in one Hindu house whose descendants were honored every year with a candle on the occasion of the Annual parish feast.

When things brightened up with the enemies' death and Priests came after the return of Christians from captivity, the Miraculous Statue was brought back with great honor and Jubilation amidst rejoicing through the river and road in a colorful two-mile long route boat procession and re-enthroned in the church on the high Altar(currently installed in the Shrine ). In memory and honor of this event,t a yearly boat procession of our Lady on a gaily and artistically decorated throne (cherell) with much solemnity grandeur, and pomp was celebrated at first from Nadu Kudru to the church on the eve of the parish feast from the ancient house of M.r Menino Francis Luis; but in the latter year,s the procession was from its neighboring Honappa Kudru from a house of his direct descendants for over a century. In the final year,s the procession commenced from Our Lady's Island Property of Barikudru due to the uncertainty of tides to bring it from Tonse. Glowing accounts of the grandeur of those annual evening festive processions and the devotion generated when all communities joined the celebrations with decorative lamps, archers,s and buntings on its route were narrated with pride and nostalgia for those days by men of the generation that has now passed.

The statue used for those processions is the one now used for Cherell in the church for processions on the feast days. This statue was found on the Malpe shore and was delivered by the fishermen to the church. It is believed to be the statue placed by Vasco da Gama on the Thonse Par Islands when he landed there and which he named the St. Mary's Islands.

In 2012, it was appointed as the Cathedral Church of the newly formed diocese, the Roman Catholic Diocese of Udupi., which was inaugurated on 15 October 2012, at the church.

See also
Statue_of_Our_Lady_of_Miracles,_Jaffna_patao

Gallery

References

.
.

External links

 Official website

Churches in Mangalore Diocese
Buildings and structures in Udupi district
Roman Catholic churches completed in 1678
Roman Catholic cathedrals in Karnataka
Roman Catholic Diocese of Udupi
1678 establishments in Asia
Churches in Kallianpur
17th-century Roman Catholic church buildings in India